Sahra Rural District is a rural district (dehestan) in Anabad District, Bardaskan County, Razavi Khorasan Province, Iran. At the 2006 census, its population was 7,916, in 2,043 families.  The rural district has 36 villages.

References 

Rural Districts of Razavi Khorasan Province
Bardaskan County
Rural Districts of Bardaskan County